The Beyşehir gudgeon (Gobio microlepidotus) is a species of gudgeon, a small freshwater in the family Cyprinidae. It is endemic to Lake Beyşehir in Turkey.

References

 

Gobio
Fish described in 1942